William D. Evans (May 10, 1852 – May 4, 1936) was a jurist in the State of Iowa from Hampton, Iowa.

Biography
Evans was born to Evan J. and Ann Evans in Marquette County, Wisconsin. On October 29, 1879 he married Julia Stark. Evans was a Congregationalist.

He died at his home in Hampton on May 4, 1936.

Career
Evans was a judge in the district court of Iowa from 1903 to 1908. From 1908 to 1934, he was a justice of the Iowa Supreme Court.

References

People from Marquette County, Wisconsin
Justices of the Iowa Supreme Court
Iowa state court judges
1852 births
1936 deaths
People from Hampton, Iowa